The discography of British-Australian singer-songwriter Reece Mastin consists of three studio albums, two extended plays, one DVD, eleven singles and nine music videos. He won the third season of The X Factor Australia in 2011. Mastin's debut single "Good Night" debuted at number one on the ARIA Singles Chart and was certified five times platinum by the Australian Recording Industry Association (ARIA), denoting sales of 350,000 copies. It also peaked at number one on the New Zealand Singles Chart and was certified platinum by the Recorded Music NZ (RMNZ), denoting sales of 15,000 copies. Mastin's self-titled debut album, which features "Good Night" and selected songs he performed on The X Factor, was released on 9 December 2011. The album debuted at number two on the ARIA Albums Chart and was certified double platinum for shipments of 140,000 copies. It also debuted at number one in New Zealand and was certified gold for sales of 7,500 copies.

"Shut Up & Kiss Me" was released as the lead single from Mastin's second studio album Beautiful Nightmare. It peaked at number two on the ARIA Singles Chart and was certified platinum, denoting sales of 70,000 copies. "Shut Up & Kiss Me" peaked at number one in New Zealand and was certified gold. The album's second single "Shout It Out" became Mastin's second number-one single on the ARIA Charts and was certified platinum. Beautiful Nightmare was released on 19 October 2012, and debuted at number three and was certified gold for shipments of 35,000 copies. It also debuted at number two on the New Zealand Albums Chart. "Rock Star" and "Timeless" were released as the third and fourth singles from the album. The former peaked at number 16 and was certified platinum.

Studio albums

Extended plays

Singles

Other charted songs

Album appearances

Videography

Video albums

References

Pop music discographies
Discographies of Australian artists